Brenda Hood is a Grenadian politician of the New National Party.  She has served in the Parliament of Grenada since 1999, and has served as the island's Minister of Tourism. In 2014, she became Minister for Culture.

References

External links 
Biography on party website

Year of birth missing (living people)
Living people
Members of the House of Representatives of Grenada
Government ministers of Grenada
New National Party (Grenada) politicians
Women government ministers of Grenada